12 Love Stories is an album released by Japanese rapper Dohzi-T. The album came in 2 versions: CD only and CD+DVD. The CD+DVD (named 12 Love Stories -Sweet Love Box-) was a limited edition containing 2 promotional videos. This was the first album from Dohzi-T to chart in the top 10 on the Oricon Chart and selling over 200,000 copies.  All the songs in the album have the same theme: love. This album contains a lot of collaborations with various artists. The album had as single release "Mō Ichi do..." which was a long charting hit selling over 80,000 copies. This album is ranked as #55 on the yearly Oricon chart.

Track listing

CD Track listing
 Mō Ichido... feat. BENI (もう一度...; Once More)
 better days feat. Miliyah Kato, Tanaka Roma
 Yakusoku no Hi feat. Thelma Aoyama (約束の日; Day of Promise)
 ONE LOVE feat. Shota Shimizu 
 Negai feat. YU-A/Foxxi misQ (願い ;Wish)
 AINOKACHI feat. KREVA 
 Good Night
 In-mail feat. JUJU
 Minori aru Jinsei o (実りある人生を; Fruitful Life)
 Hikaru Mirai feat. Miliyah Kato (光る未来; Shiny future)
 Ai ni Ikō (会いにいこう; I'll be seeing)
 summer days feat. BENI<08'ver> 
-Bonus Track-
 Kimi Dake o-remix-/Hiromi Go feat.童子-T (君だけを; For you)

DVD Track listing
 Mou Ichi do... feat BENI PV
 Yakusoku no Hi feat. Thelma Aoyama PV

References

2008 albums
Dohzi-T albums
Universal Music Japan albums
Japanese-language albums